This is a list of the orders, families and genera in the class Phaeophyceae — the brown algae.

Discosporangiophycidae

Discosporangiales

Choristocarpaceae
 Choristocarpus Zanardini 1860

Discosporangiaceae
 Discosporangiumtite Falkenberg 1878

Ishigeophycidae
 Diplura Hollenberg 1969

Ishigeales

Ishigeaceae
 Ishige Yendo 1907

Petrodermataceae
 Petroderma Kuckuck 1897

Dictypophycidae

Syringodermatales

Syringodermataceae
 Microzonia Agardh 1984
 Syringoderma Levring 1940

Onslowiales

Onslowiaceae
 Onslowia Searles 1980
 Verosphacella Henry 1987

Dictyotales

Dictyotaceae
 Canistrocarpus De Paula & De Clerck 2006
 Chlanidophora Agardh 1894 non Berg 1877
 Dictyopteris Lamouroux 1809a nom. cons.
 Dictyota Lamouroux 1809b nom. cons. [Dilophus Agardh 1882;  Glossophora Agardh 1882; Glossophorella Nizamuddin & Campbell 1995; Pachydictyon Agardh 1894]
 Dictyopsis Troll 1931
 Distromium Levring 1940
 Exallosorus Phillips 1997
 Herringtonia Kraft 2009
 Homoeostrichus Agardh 1894
 Lobophora Agardh 1894 [Pocockiella Papenfuss 1943]
 Lobospira Areschoug 1854
 Newhousia Kraft et al. 2004
 Padina Adanson 1793 nom. cons. [Dictyerpa Collins & Harvey 1901; Vaughaniella Borgesen 1950]
 Padinopsis Ercegovic 1955
 Rugulopteryx De Cerck & Coppejans 2006
 Scoresbyella Womersley 1987
 Spatoglossum Kutzing 1843
 Stoechospermum Kutzing 1843
 Stypopodium Kutzing 1843
 Taonia Agardh 1848
 Zonaria Agardh 1817

Sphacelariales

Lithodermataceae
 Bodanella Zimmermann 1927
 Heribaudiella Gomont 1896
 Lithoderma Areschoug 1875
 Pseudolithoderma Svedelius 1910

Phaeostrophionaceae
 Phaeostrophion Setchell & Gardner 1924

Sphacelodermaceae
 Sphaceloderma Kuckuck 1894

Stypocaulaceae
 Alethocladus
 Halopteris Kutzing 1843 [Stypocaulon Kutzing 1843]
 Phloiocaulon Geyler 1866
 Protohalopteris Draisma, Prud'homme & Kawai 2010
 Ptilopogon Reinke 1890

Cladostephaceae
 Cladostephus Agardh 1817

Sphacelariaceae
 Battersia Reinke ex Batters 1890 emend. Draisma, Prud'homme & Kawai 2010
 Chaetopteris Kutzing 1843
 Herpodiscus South 1974 emend. Draisma, Prud'homme & Kawai 2010
 Sphacelaria Lyngbye 1818
 Sphacella Reinke 1890
 Sphacelorbus Draisma, Prud'homme & Kawai 2010

Fucophycidae

Asterocladales

Asterocladaceae
 Asterocladon Müller, Parodi & Peters 1998

Ascoseirales

Ascoseiraceae
 Ascoseira Skottsberg 1907

Cutleriales

Cutleriaceae
 Cutleria
 Zanardinia

Desmarestiales

Arthrocladiaceae
 Arthrocladia

Desmarestiaceae
 Desmarestia
 Himantothallus
 Phaeurus

Ectocarpales

Acinetosporaceae
Acinetospora
Feldmannia
Geminocarpus
Hincksia
Pogotrichum
Pylaiella

Adenocystaceae
Adenocystis
Caepidium
Utriculidium

Chordariaceae
Acrothrix
Ascoseirophila
Asperococcus
Austrofilum
Chordaria
Cladosiphon
Corycus
Delamarea
Dictyosiphon
Elachista
Eudesme
Giraudia
Gononema
Halothrix
Haplogloia
Hecatonema
Heterosaundersella
Hummia
Isthmoplea
Laminariocolax
Laminarionema
Leathesia
Leptonematella
Litosiphon
Microspongium
Mikrosyphar
Myelophycus
Myriogloea
Myrionema
Myriotrichia
Papenfussiella
Petrospongium
Pleurocladia
Polytretus
Proselachista
Protectocarpus
Punctaria
Sauvageaugloia
Soranthera
Sorocarpus
Spermatochnus
Sphaerotrichia
Stictyosiphon
Streblonema
Striaria
Stschapovia
Tinocladia

Chordariopsidaceae
Chordariopsis

Ectocarpaceae
Ectocarpus
Kuckuckia

Mesosporaceae
Mesospora

Myrionemataceae
Asterotrichia

Pylaiellaceae
Bachelotia

Fucales

Bifurcariopsidaceae
Bifurcariopsis

Durvillaeaceae
Durvillaea

Fucaceae
Ascophyllum
Fucus
Hesperophycus
Pelvetia
Pelvetiopsis
Silvetia
Xiphophora

Himanthaliaceae
Himanthalia

Hormosiraceae
Hormosira

Notheiaceae
 Notheia

Sargassaceae

 Anthophycus
 Axillariella
 Bifurcaria
 Bifurcariopsis
 Carpoglossum
 Caulocystis
 Coccophora
 Cystophora
 Cystoseira
 Halidrys
 Hizikia
 Hormophysa
 Myagropsis
 Myogropsis
 Myriodesma
 Sargassum
 Turbinaria

Seirococcaceae
 Cystophaera
Marginariella
 Phyllospora
 Seirococcus

Laminariales

Akkesiphycaceae
 Akkesiphycus

Alariaceae
 Alaria
 Aureophycus
 Druehlia
 Eualaria
 Hirome
 Lessoniopsis
 Pleurophycus
 Pterygophora
 Undaria
 Undariella
 Undariopsis

Chordaceae
 Chorda

Costariaceae
 Agarum
 Costaria
 Dictyoneurum
 Thalassiophyllum

Laminariaceae
 Arthrothamnus
 Costularia
 Cymathere
 Feditia
 Gigantea
 Laminaria
 Macrocystis
 Nereocystis
 Pelagophycus
 Pelagophycus x Macrocystis
 Phycocastanum
 Phyllariella
 Polyschidea
 Postelsia
 Pseudolessonia
 Saccharina
 Streptophyllopsis

Lessoniaceae
 Ecklonia
 Eckloniopsis
 Egregia
 Eisenia
 Lessonia

Pseudochordaceae
 Pseudochorda

Nemodermatales

Nemodermataceae
Nemoderma

Ralfsiales

Neoralfsiaceae
Neoralfsia

Ralfsiaceae
Basispora
Hapalospongidion
Jonssonia
Myrionemopsis
Porterinema
Ralfsia

Scytosiphonales

Chnoosporaceae
Chnoospora

Scytosiphonaceae
Colpomenia
Hydroclathrus
Petalonia
Rosenvingea
Scytosiphon
Coelocladia
Phaeostroma

Scytothamnales

Scytothamnaceae
Asteronema
Scytothamnus
Stereocladon

Splachnidiaceae
Splachnidium

Sporochnales

Sporochnaceae
Austronereia
Bellotia
Carpomitra
Encyothalia
Nereia
Perisporochnus
Perithalia
Sporochnema
Sporochnus
Tomaculopsis

Tilopteridales

Halosiphonaceae
Halosiphon

Masonophycaceae
Masonophycus

Phyllariaceae
Phyllariopsis
Saccorhiza

Stschapoviaceae
Stschapovia

Tilopteridaceae
Haplospora
Phaeosiphoniella
Tilopteris

Incertae sedis

Neoleptonema

Heterochordariaceae
Analipus

References

brown algal genera
Brown algae
Brown algae
 List